is a Japanese professional wrestler currently signed to World Wonder Ring Stardom, where she is a former High Speed Champion. She became the first wrestler to wear her mask full-time in Stardom as part of her luchadora persona. Greatly influenced by Lucha libre, Starlight Kid has followed Mexican tradition for masked wrestlers, so her real name is not a matter of public record.

Professional wrestling career

World Wonder Ring Stardom (2015-present)
Starlight Kid debuted on October 11, 2015 at Goddesses of Stardom in a three-way match with Kaori Yoneyama and Momo Watanabe. On November 8, she competed in her first major Stardom tournament, teaming up with Hiromi Mimura to compete in the 2015 Goddesses of Stardom Tournament. The team lost in the first round to Watanabe & Datura. After that, she would team up with Miura very often. Kid spent most of her matches losing to other, more experienced wrestlers, which would help put over other wrestlers while at the same time giving Starlight Kid some in-ring, televised, experience.

On April 29, 2016, at the Cinderella Tournament, she participated in a dark match, teaming with Eimi Nishina in a defeat to Yoneyama and AZM. On May 15, she was involved in the opening 6-Person Tag Match, which resulted in a win for her team. On May 29, she was the opponent in Kris Wolf's return match. On June 16, she was involved in another opening 6-Person Tag Match, where her team was defeated by the team of Kaori Yoneyama, AZM & Alex Lee.

In 2017, Kid revealed in an interview for the weekly pro wrestling magazine that she would be taking a break for a long time to focus on her studies. On January 3, 2018, she returned to the ring teaming with Konami losing to Miranda & Xia Brookside. In March 2018, she would participate in the tournament for the inaugural Future of Stardom Championship where she defeated Hanan in the first round and then she would defeat Shiki Shibusawa in the tournament final to become the inaugural Future of Stardom Champion, which was newly established at the Korakuen Hall Tournament, and became the first champion. On April 15, 2018, during Stardom Draft, Kid would form a stable with Mayu Iwatani, Saki Kashima, Shiki Shibusawa, Natsumi, and Tam Nakano after she was revealed as their fifth pick with stable being later named STARS. On May 27, at Shining Stars, her first singles match with Io Shirai ended in defeat, but the audience highly praised it. Post-match, AZM challenged her for the Future of Stardom Championship, and on June 3 at Queen's Fes In Sapporo, the match went to a time-limit draw. From October 23 until November 4, Kid & Natsumi took part in the Goddesses of Stardom Tag League, finishing the tournament with a record of two wins, two losses, and one draw, failing to advance to the tournament finals. 

On January 3, 2019, Kid lost her title to Utami Hayashishita at New Years Stars, ending her reign at 281 days. At Stardom Cinderella Tournament 2019 on April 29, she made it to the semi-finals where she fell short to Konami.

At Stardom 10th Anniversary Show on January 17, 2021, Kid fell short to Tam Nakano. At Stardom All Star Dream Cinderella on March 3, 2021, Kid competed in a 24-women Stardom All Star Rumble featuring various active stars such as Mei Hoshizuki, and from the past such as Chigusa Nagayo, Kyoko Inoue, Mima Shimoda, Hiroyo Matsumoto, Emi Sakura, Momoe Nakanishi, and others. At Stardom Yokohama Dream Cinderella 2021 on April 4, Starlight Kid's journey out of Stars stable began when she teamed up with Mayu Iwatani, Saya Iida, Hanan & Gokigen Death in a Ten-woman elimination tag team match against Oedo Tai (Natsuko Tora, Ruaka, Konami, Saki Kashima & Rina). Since Death was lastly eliminated, the stipulation of the match forced her to defect Stars and join Oedo Tai. On the first night of the Stardom Cinderella Tournament 2021 from April 10, 2021, Kid defeated Momo Watanabe in the first rounds of the competition. On the second night from May 14, she fell short to Saya Kamitani in the second rounds. On the last night of the tournament from June 12, 2021, Kid left Stars stable after she, Koguma, Hanan, Iwatani and Rin Kadokura lost to Oedo Tai (Natsuko Tora, Konami, Fukigen Death, Ruaka & Saki Kashima) in a Ten-Woman Elimination Tag Team Match where the winner had to pick a member from the opposite unit with Oedo Tai picking Kid after she was eliminated in the end. At Yokohama Dream Cinderella 2021 in Summer on July 4, Kid rebranded her outfit to fit Oedo Tai's colors wearing a black and purple outfit and mask. She teamed up with Ruaka for the first time as an Oedo Tai member and fell short to Queen's Quest's Momo Watanabe & AZM. Kid also challenged Tam Nakano for the Wonder of Stardom Championship unsuccessfully on July 21. At the Stardom 5 Star Grand Prix 2021, Kid competed in the "Red Stars" block where she scored a total of 11 points after going against Momo Watanabe, Mayu Iwatani, Koguma, Himeka, Fukigen Death, Natsupoi, Giulia, Mina Shirakawa, and Saki Kashima. On August 29, on the eighth night of the Grand Prix, Kid defeated Natsupoi to win High Speed Championship. At Stardom 10th Anniversary Grand Final Osaka Dream Cinderella on October 9, 2021, Kid defended the High Speed Championship against Saki Kashima. At the 2021 edition of the Goddesses of Stardom Tag League, Kid teamed up with Ruaka as "Kurotora Kaidou" and competed in the "Blue Goddess" block where they scored a total of seven points after going against the teams of MOMOAZ (Momo Watanabe & AZM), Blue MaRine (Mayu Iwatani & Rin Kadokura), Ponytail and Samurai Road (Syuri & Maika, Dream H (Tam Nakano & Mina Shirakawa), and C Moon (Lady C & Waka Tsukiyama). Since Kawasaki Super Wars, the first event of the Stardom Super Wars trilogy which took place on November 3, 2021, Kid would enter in the quest to recruit more members into Oedo Tai which would lead to a feud with Momo Watanabe who would later be a victim of Starlight Kid's mind games as the latter's strategy to recruit members to Oedo Tai. First, Kid successfully defended the High Speed Championship against Watanabe on November 3. At Stardom Super Wars#Tokyo Super Wars|Tokyo Super Wars on November 27, she defended the High Speed title again against Koguma. Kid's mind games against Watanabe eventually degenerated into an Eight-Woman Elimination Tag Team Match at in which both of them would be the captains of their respective teams. The loser captain would be forced to join the enemy unit and if Kid lost, she would also have to unmask and reveal her real name. The match took place on December 18, at Osaka Super Wars, the event which represented the last part of the "Super Wars" trilogy. With the match coming down to the wire and Queen's Quest holding a 2 to 1 advantage over Kid, a shocking moment occurred when Watanabe betrayed her Queen's Quest and hit her long-time tag team partner AZM over the head with a chair, handing the win to Oedo Tai and with Kid keeping her mask and Watanabe joining the stable. At Stardom Dream Queendom, Kid once again defended the High Speed title successfully against AZM and Koguma in a three-way match.

At Stardom Nagoya Supreme Fight on January 29, 2022, Kid teamed up with Momo Watanabe and defeated Utami Hayashishita & AZM. At Stardom Cinderella Journey on February 23, 2022, she dropped the High Speed Championship to AZM. At Stardom New Blood 1 on March 11, 2022, Kid teamed up with Ruaka to defeat World Woman Wrestling Diana's Haruka Umesaki & Nanami. On the first night of the Stardom World Climax 2022 from March 26, Kid teamed up with Momo Watanabe and defeated FWC (Hazuki & Koguma) to win the Goddess of Stardom Championship. On the second night from March 27, Kid fell short to Kairi. At Stardom Cinderella Tournament 2022, Kid fell short to Natsupoi in the first rounds from April 3. At Stardom Golden Week Fight Tour on May 5, 2022, Kid & Watanabe dropped the Goddess of Stardom Championship back to Hazuki & Koguma. At Stardom New Blood 2 on May 13, 2022, Kid teamed up with Ruaka & Rina in a losing effort against Cosmic Angels (Mina Shirakawa & Unagi Sayaka) & Haruka Umesaki. At Stardom Flashing Champions on May 28, 2022, Kid teamed up with Saki Kashima & Momo Watanabe to defeat MaiHimePoi (Maika, Himeka & Natsupoi) for the Artist of Stardom Championship. At Stardom Fight in the Top on June 26, 2022, Kid teamed up once again with Watanabe & Kashima to score their first defense of the Artist of Stardom Championship against Giulia, Maika & Mai Sakurai. At Stardom New Blood 3, Kid teamed up with Rina, Ruaka & Haruka Umesaki to defeat Cosmic Angels (Mina Shirakawa, Unagi Sayaka & Color's (Yuko Sakurai & Rina Amikura)). At Mid Summer Champions in Tokyo, the first event of the Stardom Mid Summer Champions series which took place on July 9, 2022, Kid unsuccessfully challenged Saya Kamitani for the Wonder of Stardom Championship. On the second night at Mid Summer Champions in Nagoya on July 24, Kid teamed up with Momo Watanabe & Saki Kashima to successfully defend the Artist of Stardom Championship against Giulia, Maika & Himeka. At Stardom New Blood 4 on August 26, 2022, Kid teamed up with Haruka Umesaki in a losing effort against God's Eye (Mirai & Ami Sourei). At Stardom in Showcase vol.2 on September 25, 2022, Kid fell short to Suzu Suzuki in a 5 Star Grand Prix Tournament match. At Stardom 5 Star Grand Prix 2022, Kid competed in the "Blue Stars" block where she scored a total of 14 points after going against Giulia, Mirai, Mayu Iwatani, Hazuki, Saya Kamitani, Natsupoi, Momo Watanabe, Ami Sourei, Mina Shirakawa, Saya Iida, and Hanan.

New Japan Pro Wrestling (2022-present)
Kid often competes in exhibition matches organized by NJPW in partnership with Stardom. On January 5, 2022, on the second night of New Japan Pro-Wrestling (NJPW)'s Wrestle Kingdom 16, she made her first NJPW appearance where she, alongside Mayu Iwatani fell short to Tam Nakano & Saya Kamitani.

Championships and accomplishments
Pro Wrestling Illustrated
Ranked No. 9 of the top 150 female wrestlers in the PWI Female 100 in 2022	
Ranked No. 51 of the top 100 female wrestlers in the PWI Female 100 in 2018
Ranked No. 76 of the top 150 female singles wrestlers in the PWI Women's 150 in 2021
World Wonder Ring Stardom
High Speed Championship (1 time)
Goddess of Stardom Championship  (1 time) – with Momo Watanabe
Artist of Stardom Championship (1 time) – with Momo Watanabe & Saki Kashima (1)
Future of Stardom Championship (1 time)
Best Technique Award (2018)
5★Star GP Award (1 time)
5★Star GP Technical Skill Award (2021) 
Stardom Year-End Award (4 times)
Best Technique Award (2018)
Best Unit Award (2021) 
Fighting Spirit Award (2022)
Shining Award (2021)

References

External links

 

2001 births
Living people
Japanese female professional wrestlers
Masked wrestlers
Unidentified wrestlers
21st-century professional wrestlers
Goddess of Stardom Champions
Artist of Stardom Champions
Future of Stardom Champions
High Speed Champions